Nataliya Nikolayevna Krasilnikova (Наталья Николаевна Красильникова, born 2 January 1982) is a Kazakhstani female water polo player. She was a member of the Kazakhstan women's national water polo team, playing as a centre back. 

She was a part of the  team at the 2004 Summer Olympics. On club level she played for Eurasia Rakhat in Kazakhstan.

References

External links
http://www.zimbio.com/photos/Natalya+Krassilnikova
http://www.gettyimages.co.uk/photos/canadian-ann-dow?excludenudity=true&sort=mostpopular&mediatype=photography&phrase=canadian%20ann%20dow

1982 births
Living people
Kazakhstani female water polo players
Water polo players at the 2004 Summer Olympics
Olympic water polo players of Kazakhstan
Sportspeople from Almaty
21st-century Kazakhstani women